Arna Church is a parish church of the Church of Norway in Bergen Municipality in Vestland county, Norway. It is located in the village of Indre Arna. It is one of two churches in the Arna parish which is part of the Åsane prosti (deanery) in the Diocese of Bjørgvin. The white, stone church was built in a long church design in 1864 using plans drawn up by the architect Frederik Hannibal Stockfleth. The church seats about 280 people.

History
In 1861, a cemetery was built in Arna, and soon after, planning began for a church at the cemetery. Frederik Hannibal Stockfleth was hired to design the new church and a man named Wangberg was hired as the lead builder. The church was completed in 1864, a date that is prominently displayed on the side of the church, and it was consecrated in 1865. The church received its first organ in 1912. In 1928, the church interior was refurbished and repainted. In 1936, a sacristy was built on the north and south sides of the choir using designs by the architect Erlend Tryti. The church was again renovated from 1964-1965 for the church's centennial celebrations, using plans by the architect R. Brandvik.

Media gallery

See also
List of churches in Bjørgvin

References

Churches in Bergen
Long churches in Norway
Stone churches in Norway
19th-century Church of Norway church buildings
Churches completed in 1864
1864 establishments in Norway